Rajyapala was the eighth emperor of the Pala dynasty. He succeeded his father Narayanapala. He reigned for 32 years. The Bharat Kala Bhaban is dated in his 2nd regnal year, while the Bargaon inscription is dated in his 24th regnal year. He was succeeded by his son Gopala III.

See also
List of rulers of Bengal

References

Year of birth missing
940 deaths
Pala kings